Volta–Congo is a major branch of the Atlantic–Congo family. It includes all the Niger-Congo languages and subfamilies except the families of the erstwhile Atlantic and Kordofanian branches, Mande, Dogon, and Ijo. It thus only differs from Atlantic–Congo in that it excludes the Atlantic languages and, in some conceptions, Kru and Senufo. 

In the infobox at the right, the languages which appear to be the most divergent (including the dubious Senufo and Kru, which may not be Volta–Congo at all) are placed at the top, whereas those closer to the core (the similar "Benue–Kwa" branches of Kwa, Volta–Niger and Benue–Congo) are near the bottom. If the Kwa or Savannas branches prove to be invalid, the tree will be even more crowded.

Classification 
Comparative linguistic research by John M. Stewart in the sixties and seventies helped establish the genetic unity of Volta–Congo and shed light on its internal structure, but the results remain tentative. Williamson and Blench (2000) note that in many cases it is difficult to draw clear lines between the branches of Volta–Congo and suggest that this might indicate the diversification of a dialect continuum rather than a clear separation of families. This had been suggested before by Bennet (1983 as cited in Williamson and Blench 2000:17) in the case of the Gur and Adamawa–Ubangi languages, which apart from Ubangian are now linked together as Savannas. Other branches are Kru, Senufo, Kwa, and Benue–Congo, which includes the well-known and particularly numerous Bantu group. The relationship of Kwa to Benue–Congo (named Benue–Kwa), and the eastern and western branches of Benue–Congo to each other, remain obscure.

The vowel systems of Volta–Congo languages have been the subject of much historical comparative linguistic debate. Casali (1995) defends the hypothesis that Proto-Volta–Congo had a nine- or ten-vowel system employing vowel harmony and that this set has been reduced to a seven vowel-system in many Volta–Congo languages. The Ghana–Togo Mountain languages are examples of languages where nine- or ten-vowel systems are still found.

See also
 Languages of Africa
 Language family

Footnotes

References
 Casali, Roderic F. (1995) 'On the Reduction of Vowel Systems in Volta–Congo', African Languages and Cultures, 8, 2, Dec, 109–121.
 Stewart, John M. (1976) Towards Volta–Congo reconstruction: a comparative study of some languages of Black-Africa. (Inaugural speech, Leiden University) Leiden: Universitaire Pers Leiden.
 Stewart, John M. (1985) 'Nasality patterns in the Volta–Congo foot.' Paper presented at the Colloquium on African Linguistics, Leiden, Sept. 1985.
 Williamson, Kay & Blench, Roger (2000) 'Niger–Congo', in Heine, Bernd and Nurse, Derek (eds) African Languages — An Introduction. Cambridge: Cambridge University press, pp. 11–42.

 
Atlantic–Congo languages